USS Voyager can refer to:
 , a motorboat that served in the United States Navy from 1917 to 1919 and in the United States Coast Guard from 1919 to c. 1936
 USS Voyager (Star Trek) (NCC-74656), a fictional starship that is the primary setting for the television series Star Trek: Voyager

See also
 , two ships of the Royal Australian Navy 
 , the proposed name for the second vessel in the Virgin Galactic fleet
 Voyager (disambiguation)

United States Navy ship names